Packard was an American industrial manufacturing company, best known for its eponymous automobile marque.

Packard may also refer to:

 Packard (surname)
 Packard Business College, New York City
 Packard F.C., early 20th century soccer club, sponsored by the automaker
 Packard Formation, Mesozoic geologic formation in Mexico
 Packard Glacier, Antarctica
 Packard Jennings (born 1970), American artist
 Packard Proving Grounds, former automotive testing facility near Utica, Michigan, which once belonged to the above-mentioned automaker
 Packard Stadium, home park of the Arizona State Sun Devils baseball team
 Packard, Kentucky, ghost town
 Packard, Wisconsin, unincorporated community

See also
 Packard Bell, Dutch computer manufacturer
 Packard Commission, appointed by U.S. President Reagan to study the management of the Department of Defense
 Hewlett-Packard, present-day electronics company, unrelated to the former industrial manufacturer
 The David and Lucile Packard Foundation, a charitable foundation created by Hewlett-Packard founder David Packard